BCISD may stand for:
Bay City Independent School District in Bay City, Texas
Bridge City Independent School District in Bridge City, Texas
Borden County Independent School District in Gail, Texas
Burnet County Independent School District in Burnet County, Texas (Unincorporated Territory)